Kaleida are an English electropop duo from London, England, formed in 2013. The band consists of vocalist Christina Wood and keyboardist Cicely Goulder. Kaleida released their debut EP, Think, in 2015, followed by Tear the Roots in 2017 and Odyssey in 2020. In 2014, the band's title track from their debut EP appeared on the soundtrack of the action film John Wick.

History

2013–2015: Formation and Think
Kaleida formed in 2013, when Wood and Goulder were introduced by a mutual friend through email. At the time, Wood had been at work in the forests of Borneo, while Goulder had been in the film industry. From 2013 to late 2014, the duo released demos of songs "Think" and "Tropea," releasing a video for the latter in 2013. On 19 December 2014 Lex Records announced they had signed Kaleida and would be releasing their debut extended play, Think, on 6 April 2015. In 2014, Kaleida garnered worldwide attention when their song, "Think", was featured in the 2014 action film John Wick and its soundtrack. The song's minimalist structure specifically contrasted the violent scenes in which it was used.

2015–Touring and Detune
In a 2015 interview with Ground Sounds, Kaleida stated that following their European tour with Róisín Murphy, the band would begin work on their debut album. On 3 November 2015 Kaleida released a new single, "Detune". On 24 February 2016 the band released a new single, "It's Not Right," and a second EP, Detune, was released on 26 February. Their debut album, Tear the Roots, was set for a September 2017 release.

2017–Tear The Roots
Kaleida released their debut album, Tear The Roots, on 15 September 2017.

2020 – Odyssey 
Kaleida released their second album, Odyssey, on 28 August 2020.

Members
Christina Wood - vocals (2013–present)
Cicely Goulder - keyboards, production (2013–present)

Discography

Extended plays
 Think (Lex Records, 2015)
 Detune (Lex Records, 2016)

Albums
 Tear the Roots (Lex Records, 2017)
 Odyssey (Lex Records, 2020)

Singles
 "Think" (2013)
 "Tropea" (2013)
 "Picture You" (2014)
 "Aliaa" (2015)
 "Detune" (2015)
 "It's Not Right" (2016)
 "99 Luftballons" (2017)
 "Other Side" (2020)
 "Long Noon" (2020)
 "Odyssey" (2020) 
 "Smells Like Teen Spirit" (2020)

Appearances on soundtracks
 John Wick: Original Motion Picture Soundtrack - "Think" (2014)
 CSI – "Aliaa" (2014)
 Search Party - "The Call" (2016)
 Atomic Blonde: Original Motion Picture Soundtrack - "99 Luftballons" (2017)
 Wu Assassins (Netflix Original Series S1:E1) - "Aliaa" (2019)
 Monarca (Netflix Original Series) - "The Call" and "Aliaa" (2019)
 Charmed (Netflix Original Series) - "Detune" (2019)

References

External links
 Official website

Electropop groups
English synth-pop groups
Musical groups established in 2013
Musical groups from London
English electronic music duos
Lex Records artists
2013 establishments in England